Next Step Realty: NYC is an American reality television series that aired on ABC Family from August 11, 2015 to October 15, 2015. It was about the company, The Next Step Realty, which helps people find apartments in New York City with an exclusive tour using chauffeured limousines to transport clients.

Cast
Matt Bauman, Managing Broker
Blair Brandt, Co-founder & CEO
Anna Cogswell, Director of client hospitality
Brianna Coughlan, Licensed real estate agent
David G. Ghysels III, Licensed real estate salesperson
Edward “Field” Hucks, Senior vice president
Michaela Lalanne, Client relations associate
Victoria Scott, Licensed real estate salesperson
Margit Weinberg
Erin Wilson, Director of client relations
Danielle Rossen, Executive producer
Michael Driscoll, Co-executive producer

Episodes

Broadcast
Internationally, the series premiered in Australia on Arena on February 2, 2016.

References

External links

 
 

2010s American reality television series
2015 American television series debuts
2015 American television series endings
ABC Family original programming
English-language television shows
Freeform (TV channel) original programming
Television series by Disney–ABC Domestic Television